Derrick Bo Lewis (born November 15, 1974) is a former Canadian football defensive back in the Canadian Football League who played for the BC Lions and Toronto Argonauts. He played college football for the Jackson State Tigers.

References

1974 births
Living people
American football defensive backs
Canadian football defensive backs
BC Lions players
Toronto Argonauts players
Jackson State Tigers football players
Place of birth missing (living people)